Eduardo Vieira do Nascimento, shortly Edu (born January 11, 1983) is a Brazilian footballer who plays as a forward.

His previous club was Caxias (RS), J. Malucelli (PR), Daejeon Citizen in South Korea, FC Porto in Portugal and Iraty (PR).

Honour
Campeonato Paranaense in 2002 with Iraty Sport Club

References

External links
 

1983 births
Living people

Brazilian footballers

Brazilian expatriate footballers
Association football forwards
Iraty Sport Club players
FC Porto players
Daejeon Hana Citizen FC players
K League 1 players
J. Malucelli Futebol players
Expatriate footballers in South Korea
Sociedade Esportiva e Recreativa Caxias do Sul players
Operário Ferroviário Esporte Clube players
Brazilian expatriate sportspeople in South Korea